The River Till SSSI is a  biological Site of Special Scientific Interest in Wiltshire, England, notified in 2000.

The notification applies to the whole length of the River Till, from its source near Orcheston (on Salisbury Plain between Tilshead and Shrewton) to its confluence with the River Wylye. It is significant because its vegetation includes water crowfoot, which provides habitat for fish and snails.

References

Sites of Special Scientific Interest in Wiltshire
Sites of Special Scientific Interest notified in 2000